John Petit may refer to:

John Edward Petit (1895–1973), Roman Catholic prelate; Bishop of Menevia, 1947–1972
John Lewis Petit (1736–1780), English physician
John Louis Petit (1801–1868), English clergyman and architectural artist
Sir John Petit, High Sheriff of Cornwall, 1334–1336

See also
Jean Petit (disambiguation)